The Hilton of Cadboll Stone is a Class II Pictish stone discovered at Hilton of Cadboll, on the East coast of the Tarbat Peninsula in Easter Ross, Scotland.  It is one of the most magnificent of all Pictish cross-slabs.  On the seaward-facing side is a Christian cross, and on the landward facing side are secular depictions.  The latter are carved below the Pictish symbols of crescent and v-rod and double disc and Z-rod: a hunting scene including a woman wearing a large penannular brooch riding side-saddle. Like other similar stones, it can be dated to about 800 AD.

The stone was formerly on in the vicinity of a chapel just north of the village.  It was removed to Invergordon Castle in the 19th century, before being donated to the British Museum.  The latter move was not popular with the Scottish public, and so it was moved once more, to the Museum of Scotland, where it remains today.  A reconstruction, designed and carved by Barry Grove, was recently erected on the site.

In 1998 excavation in the vicinity of the Hilton of Cadboll chapel site was undertaken by Kirkdale Archaeology (Paul Sharman and Jon Triscott) on behalf of Historic Scotland. During this work approximately 40 fragments of carved micaceous sandstone were recovered; the likely origin for these was surmised to be the Hilton of Cadboll stone.

Subsequently, in 2001, Historic Scotland commissioned Kirkdale Archaeology (Dave Murray, Stuart Jeffrey, Meggen Gondek, and Angus Mackintosh) to undertake a further excavation. Assisted by Barry Grove, a further 740 carved sandstone fragments, and 122 possibly carved fragments, were recovered. In addition, the fabled missing lower portion of the cross-slab was discovered (by Angus Mackintosh), but left in-situ.

Later in 2001 the lower portion of the cross-slab, along with several thousand more carved fragments, was recovered by Glasgow University Archaeological Research Division (GUARD) during an excavation funded by Historic Scotland. Following some controversy around where this section of the monument should be curated it was finally put on display in Hilton of Cadboll village hall rather than joining the upper portion at the Museum of Scotland.  In parallel with the excavation, Historic Scotland also funded research carried out by Professor Sian Jones of the University of Manchester into the significance of Early Medieval Sculpture to local communities which concentrated on the historical fragmentation and movement of the Hilton of Cadboll monument as well its modern role in the production of meaning, value and place, The excavation and subsequent analysis of the 'biography' of the monument was the foundation of a major monograph published by the Society of Antiquaries of Scotland in 2008. The digital elements of the excavation archive were deposited with the Archaeology Data Service.
 

Six burials were also revealed during the work, indicating that the stone was likely (re)used to mark the cemetery. Only one skeleton was fully excavated and removed; the others remained undisturbed throughout the duration of the fieldwork. The burials contained various types of pottery and some stones with an unknown glaze on the surface. Several metatarsals were removed for radiocarbon dating, but were returned to the site once testing was complete.

Ten soil samples were taken from the site which appeared to contain charcoal or other evidence about the environment. These samples were subjected to optically stimulated luminescence (OSL) dating coupled with the analysis of the stratigraphy in order to establish the age and content of the soil. Five distinct levels were discovered in the soil which date from 9th century to present day.

Notes

References

External links
Hilton of Cadboll Stone at the National Museum of Scotland

Collections of the National Museums of Scotland
Pictish stones in Highland (council area)
Pictish stones